Robert J. Higdon Jr. is an American attorney who served as the United States Attorney for the United States District Court for the Eastern District of North Carolina from 2017 to 2021.

Prior to assuming his current role, he was a partner at the law firm of Williams Mullen. Higdon was previously an Assistant United States Attorney in both the Western and Eastern Districts of North Carolina. In the Eastern District U.S. Attorney's Office, he served as Chief of the Criminal Division for more than 11 years, supervising and prosecuting criminal cases involving drug trafficking, terrorism, violent crime, white collar crime, and public corruption. Higdon also served as senior trial counsel in the Public Integrity Section of the United States Department of Justice. In 2012, he led the federal prosecution in a campaign finance fraud case involving Democrat John Edwards. On February 8, 2021, he along with 55 other Trump-era attorneys were asked to resign. Higdon announced his resignation on February 11, effective February 28, 2021.

References

External links
 Biography at U.S. Attorney's Office

Living people
20th-century American lawyers
21st-century American lawyers
United States Attorneys for the Eastern District of North Carolina
Wake Forest University alumni
Wake Forest University School of Law alumni
Assistant United States Attorneys
Year of birth missing (living people)